The Al Morgan Show is an American variety program broadcast on the DuMont Television Network from 1949 to 1951.  The series starred pianist and songwriter Al Morgan.

Format
Morgan performed for most of the program, which also featured the Billy Chandler Trio.  Guests occasionally appeared.

Broadcast
Unlike most DuMont offerings which were broadcast from the network's studios in New York City, the series was broadcast from WGN-TV in Chicago. The show aired Mondays at 8:30 p.m. ET.

Don Cook was the director.

See also
List of programs broadcast by the DuMont Television Network
List of surviving DuMont Television Network broadcasts
1949-50 United States network television schedule
1950-51 United States network television schedule

References

Bibliography
David Weinstein, 'The Forgotten Network: DuMont and the Birth of American Television' (Philadelphia: Temple University Press, 2004) 
Alex McNeil, Total Television, Fourth edition (New York: Penguin Books, 1980)

External links
 
 DuMont historical website

1949 American television series debuts
1951 American television series endings
1940s American variety television series
1950s American variety television series
Black-and-white American television shows
DuMont Television Network original programming
English-language television shows
Lost television shows